N. Kayalvizhi  is an Indian politician and a Member of Tamil Nadu Legislative Assembly representing Dharapuram. She belongs to the Dravida Munnetra Kazhagam party. Kayalvizhi is the Minister for Adi Dravidar Welfare in Tamil Nadu since May 7, 2021.

Education 
She has qualified as a Master of Commerce (M.Com) at Trichy in the year 1993. She also qualified with a Bachelor of Education (B.Ed) at Madras University in 1994.

Profession 
She is a politician by profession. she is active in politics since 1996 as a member of DMK - Women Wing.

Legislative member 
She contested the 2021 election for Tamil Nadu Legislative Assembly from the Dharapuram constituency in the Tiruppur District, and won against the BJP's state president L. Murugan.

Elections contested and results

References 

Living people
Dravida Munnetra Kazhagam politicians
Tamil Nadu MLAs 2021–2026
People from Tiruppur district
1969 births